Franklin Mine may refer to a location in the United States:

Franklin Mine, Michigan, an unincorporated community
Franklin Furnace, a famous mineral location in New Jersey